Jaime Lissavetzky Díez (born 27 September 1951) is a Spanish chemist and politician. Secretary of State for Sport (2004–2011) and regional minister of Education of the Government of the Community of Madrid. He was member of the 1st, 2nd, 3rd, 4th and 5th terms of the Assembly of Madrid, as well as member of the 8th Congress of Deputies and city councillor in the Ayuntamiento of Madrid.

Early life 
Lissavetzky was born on 27 September 1951 in Madrid. He is son of a Ukrainian father based in Spain and a Spanish mother. He has a PhD in Chemistry from the Complutense University of Madrid (UCM). He became a member of the Spanish Socialist Worker's Party (PSOE) in 1974. Lissavetzky, who worked as associate professor of Chemistry in the UCM, became a researcher of the Spanish National Research Council (CSIC) in 1979.

He was placed 38th in the PSOE's list of candidates for the first elections to the Assembly of Madrid, and became regional MP. He renovated his seat in the Assembly of Madrid in the 1987, 1991, 1995, 1999 elections. He was also Senator designate by the regional parliament, while also holding the position of Spokesperson of the PSOE in the regional chamber.

He was appointed regional minister of Education and Youth in the cabinet of Joaquín Leguina in 1985, replacing Manuel de la Rocha Rubí. The office was renamed to regional minister of Education, Youth and Sports in 1991. The Charles III University of Madrid was opened during his mandate (1989), as well as the stadium of La Peineta (1994).

After the arrival of José Luis Rodríguez Zapatero to the presidency of the Government of Spain, Lissavetzky was appointed as Secretary of State for the Sport on 20 April 2004.

He was the first candidate in the PSOE's list for the 2011 municipal election in Madrid (and subsequently proposed PSOE candidate to the Mayorship), becoming the leader of the opposition in the City Council for the 2011–2015 period. In 2014 he announced he wouldn't run for the lead position in the PSOE list in the 2015 local election, paving the way for the candidacy of Antonio Miguel Carmona.

Honors 
 Great Cross of the Civil Order of Alfonso X, the Wise (1996)
 Great Cross of the Order of Civil Merit (2011)
 Great Cross of the Royal Order of Sports Merit (2011)
 Great Cross of the Order of Dos de Mayo (2015)

References 

|-

|-

|-

|-

Living people
1951 births
Government ministers of the Community of Madrid
Members of the Senate of Spain
Members of the 1st Assembly of Madrid
Members of the 2nd Assembly of Madrid
Members of the 3rd Assembly of Madrid
Members of the 4th Assembly of Madrid
Members of the 5th Assembly of Madrid
Members of the 8th Congress of Deputies (Spain)
Madrid city councillors (2011–2015)
Members of the Socialist–Progressive Parliamentary Group (Assembly of Madrid)
Members of the Socialist Parliamentary Group (Assembly of Madrid)
Spanish people of Ukrainian descent